Bondebladet may refer to:

Bondebladet (newspaper), published from 1914 to 1935.
Bondebladet (weekly), published currently.